William Brandon Lacy Campos (August 31, 1977 – November 9, 2012) was an American poet, writer, blogger, columnist, LGBT and HIV/AIDS activist.

Early life
Campos was born  on August 31, 1977 in Duluth, Minnesota, to Deborah Carey Watt and William Edward Lacy. His great-great uncle was the Black historian Dr. Carter G. Woodson, the second Black man to be awarded a doctorate from Harvard University and the founder of Black History Month (BHM).

He attended schools in Minneapolis and graduated from the Patrick Henry High School in 1995, where he was a member of the Student Council (SC). Campos continued his education at the Warren Wilson College in Swannanoa Valley, North Carolina, the Universidad de Puerto Rico, Rio Piedras, and the University of Minnesota where he received a bachelor's degree in political science.

Advocacy career
Campos became co-chair of the National Queer Student Coalition (NQSC) as a teenager.

His career included work at the Center for Media Justice in Oakland, California, where he was also the founding chair (term of office from February 2003 to December 31, 2004) of the Lavender Greens, the Green Party LGBT Identity Caucus.

Campos was a regular presenter and participant at the National LGBTQ Task Force's annual Creating Change Conference.  He co-chaired the United States Student Association's  Queer Student Coalition.  He was also a graduate of the Task Force Youth Leadership Training Institute in 1999.

In his final years, Campos would become the co-executive director of Queers for Economic Justice (QEJ).  where he worked on LGBT issues of social justice in New York City (NYC). He was a board member of the Audre Lorde Project. He was also involved in supporting the Hetrick-Martin Institute. He also joined Volttage.com, a dating site aimed at eliminating stigma and providing support to the HIV-positive community, as a support, model and spokesman.

HIV-positive since his mid-20s, he spoke extensively about his serostatus, his experience and reflection as a man of colour, but also on his recovery from addiction to crystal meth, his love for food, love and political, social justice reflections on life. He described himself as "a poet, playwright, journalist, amateur chef and life commentator doing his bit to put his foot in the asses of the regressive masses, while putting filling and nutritious food on plates of folks that ain't got much and deserve better."

Campos died on November 9, 2012, in NYC.

Publications, blogs, and writings. 
Campos was the author of the blog My Feet Only Walk Forward. He was co-contributor to the Huffington Post discussing black masculinity image, perception and stigma. He also contributed a regular column in The Body entitled "Queer, Poz and Colored".

In 2009, MyLatinoVoice.com named him the number 2 queer Latino blogger to watch. In 2006, the Star Tribune named him a young policy wonk for his political shenanigans.

A poet, he was the author of the volume of poetry It Ain't Truth If It Doesn't Hurt with illustrations by David Berube from his Face a Day collection. The volume was published in July 2011.

He created the Alfred C. Carey Prize in Spoken Word Poetry in honor of his grandfather.

He published poetry in Ganymede (literary journal) in 2008.

He contributed to the anthology From Macho To Mariposa: New Gay Latino Fiction, published in March 2011.

He wrote about being "the only non-PhD candidate" to have written a chapter in an edited collection called Queer Twin Cities: Twin Cities GLBT Oral History Project.

He contributed to the poetry collection Mariposas: A Modern Anthology of Queer Latino Poetry, published in October 2008.

He was a contributor to Beyond Resistance! Youth Activism and Community Change: New Democratic Possibilities for Practice and Policy for America's Youth, published in March 2006.

Political and social engagement 
In a speech in November 2012 at Tufts University, he tackled a recurrent theme in his life — his status as a multi-racial man:

I am standing in front of you a black, white, Ojibwe, Afro-Boricua, HIV-positive queer man, he said. And I am just as black as any of you… No more high yellow and midnight blue conversations when talking about skin unless it's to talk about how that high yellow or midnight blue person rocked your socks last night after that party and you are about to take his or her last name. I could give a damn about the style you wear your hair, fried died and laid to the side or afro-tastic, I am with Miss India.Arie, I am not my hair!

In a speech in 2012 at the Civil Liberties and Public Policy Conference at Hampshire College, he called for HIV to be a central concern of the movement for reproductive freedom:

HIV isn't over. It's relevant to your work. It's relevant to your lives. It is not just a disease that affects white gay men. It isn't a disease that impacts only men of color on the down-low. In fact, it isn't a disease that impacts only men. Women, and specifically women of color, and even more specifically African-American and Latina women, are the fastest-growing population of people living with HIV. And with 300,000 women living with HIV in the United States and women representing more than 50% of HIV cases around the world, you cannot in justice or in faith remove issues of HIV from reproductive justice.

References

External links 
 My Feet Only Walk Forward
 It Ain't Truth If It Doesn't Hurt
 Fairy Chef
 Spoken word poetry on YouTube

1977 births
2012 deaths
American bloggers
HIV/AIDS activists
20th-century American poets
21st-century American poets
American male poets
American columnists
LGBT people from Minnesota
American LGBT rights activists
Warren Wilson College alumni
University of Puerto Rico alumni
University of Minnesota College of Liberal Arts alumni
20th-century American male writers
21st-century American male writers
20th-century American non-fiction writers
21st-century American non-fiction writers
American male non-fiction writers
American male bloggers
Writers from Minneapolis
People from Duluth, Minnesota